Christopher L. Parson is an American voice actor and a 2001 graduate of the USC School of Cinema Television (now USC School of Cinematic Arts).

Career
Parson began his career working primarily as an assistant in talent management while still a student, and worked briefly in digital artist management for Sony Pictures Imageworks.

It was after being laid-off from Sony that Parson decided to pursue a career in voiceover, one he entered after responding to a classified ad on the popular website Craigslist.

He subsequently appeared as the narrator in several documentaries, appearing on The Fifth Element special edition DVD and The Pursuit of Happyness DVD, as well as VH1's mini-series Fabulous Life: Really Rich Real Estate. Parson also served as the narrator for the Fox series Nashville.

Parson had voiced the title role (as well as many others) on Comedy Central's animated series Lil' Bush, and has lent his voice to episodes of Fox's popular shows Family Guy, American Dad!, The Cleveland Show, and Disney's Handy Manny.

Currently, he is the on-air promotions voice for the popular cable network, Syfy.  He became the voice of Syfy after its rebranding in July, 2009.

Parson's voice is also featured in Gore Verbinski's animated feature, Rango, starring Johnny Depp.

Parson has also provided voice overs for several video games; he voiced the character Yusuf Tazim in Assassin's Creed: Revelations and has provided additional voiceover work for Red Faction: Guerrilla, Infamous 2, Mafia III, Grand Theft Auto V, Skylanders: Spyro's Adventure, Prototype 2, and Overwatch. Recently, he voiced the character Gladiolus Amicitia in Final Fantasy XV, Final Fantasy XV: Comrades, Final Fantasy XV: Episode Gladiolus, Final Fantasy XV: Monster of the Deep and Final Fantasy XV: Episode Ignis.

Parson resides in Los Angeles, California and is represented by SBV Talent.

Filmography

Film

Animation

Video games

References

External links 
 

21st-century American male actors
American male video game actors
American male voice actors
USC School of Cinematic Arts alumni
Place of birth missing (living people)
Year of birth missing (living people)
Living people